Nilwande dam, also called as Upper Pravara dam, in the Indian state of Maharashtra is the second largest dam on the Pravara river. The dam is located near Akole, Ahmednagar district.

Specifications

Purpose
 Irrigation
domestic use

See also
 List of dams and reservoirs in Maharashtra
 List of dams and reservoirs in India

References

Dams in Ahmednagar district
Dams completed in 2011
Roller-compacted concrete dams
2011 establishments in Maharashtra